Lebanese Haitians are Haitians of Lebanese descent or Lebanese with Haitian citizenship.

Notable Lebanese Haitians

André Apaid Jr., American-born tycoon (partial Lebanese descent because his mother is a Haitian native)
André Apaid Sr., businessman and political activist who was a strong supporter of Jean-Claude Duvalier
Claude Apaid, brother of André Apaid Sr. and owner of the computer company that has secured the government contract to supply voting machines in Haiti
Jessie Al-Khal, businesswoman; manager for the compas band T-Vice; mother of Roberto Martino and Reynaldo Martino
John Boulos, professional footballer
Pierrot Al-Khal, renowned musician for compas band, Les Gypsies de Pétion-Ville
Robert Malval, Prime Minister of Haiti (1993−1994)
Reynaldo Martino, singer, composer and maestro for the popular compas band, T-Vice (partial Lebanese descent)
Roberto Martino lead singer and guitarist/composer for the popular compas band, T-Vice (partial Lebanese descent)
Steeven Saba, professional footballer

See also

 Arab diaspora
 Arab Haitians
 Mulatto Haitian
 Palestinian Haitian
 Syrian Haitian

References

Hossary, Nagia (Archive article)

Arab Haitian
Ethnic groups in Haiti
Lebanese Caribbean
 
Haiti